Sparganothina alta is a species of moth of the family Tortricidae. It is found in Durango, Mexico.

The length of the forewings is about 9 mm. The forewings are cream with dark-brown markings and a few orange-brown scales. The hindwings are greyish brown with a pattern of fine darker brown lines.

Etymology
The species name refers to the high altitude collecting site and is derived from Latin alta (meaning high).

References

Moths described in 2001
Sparganothini